The 2017 Toyota Premier Cup was the 7th Toyota Premier Cup. It's a single-game cup competition organized by the Toyota  and Football Association of Thailand. It features SCG Muangthong United the winners of the 2016 Thai League Cup and Sanfrecce Hiroshima as an invited team from the 2016 J1 League (Japan). Competition features at National Stadium, Bangkok and sponsored by Toyota Motor (Thailand) Co., Ltd.

Qualified teams

Match

Details

Assistant referees:
  Park In-sun
  Bang Ki-yeol
Fourth official:
  Chaireag Ngamsom
Match Commissioner:
  Weerayut Sirisap
Referee Assessor:
  Sakdarin Suwanjira
General Coordinator:
  Ekapol Polnavee
Media Officer:
  Anuwat Phandinthong

Statistics

Winner

Prizes for winner
 A champion trophy.
 1,000,000 THB prize money.
 A car, Toyota Corolla Altis ESPORT.

Prizes for runners-up
 500,000 THB prize money.

References

News from Goal.com(Thailand). Buriram United invitation to 2016 Mekong Club Championship and SCG Muangthong United invitation to 2017 Toyota Premier Cup.
Official news from SCG Muangthong United's website . SCG Muangthong United invitation to 2017 Toyota Premier Cup.
News from Buggaboo.tv(Channel 7 Thailand). Buriram United invitation to 2016 Mekong Club Championship and SCG Muangthong United invitation to 2017 Toyota Premier Cup.
News from Workpoint TV(Broadcast Thailand television). Buriram United invitation to 2016 Mekong Club Championship and SCG Muangthong United invitation to 2017 Toyota Premier Cup.
News from SCG Muangthong United's fan club website. SCG Muangthong United invitation to 2017 Toyota Premier Cup.

2017
2017